is a railway station in Susenji 1-chome, Nishi-ku, Fukuoka City, Fukuoka Prefecture, Japan. It is operated by JR Kyushu and is on the Chikuhi Line.

Lines
Local and weekday rapid services on the Chikuhi Line stop at this station.

Station layout 
The station consists of an island platform serving two tracks. The station building is a wooden structure of western design and houses a waiting area and a staffed ticket window. Access to the opposite side platform is by means of a footbridge and a pair of elevators, one that takes you to the top of the footbridge and another to bring you down to the platform. 

Management of the station has been outsourced to the JR Kyushu Tetsudou Eigyou Co., a wholly owned subsidiary of JR Kyushu specialising in station services. It staffs the ticket counter which is equipped with a Midori no Madoguchi facility.

Platforms

Adjacent stations

History
In the third phase of expansion, the line was extended further east with  opening as the new eastern terminus on 15 April 1925. On the same day, Susenji was opened as an intermediate station on the new track. When the Kitakyushu Railway was nationalized on 1 October 1937, Japanese Government Railways (JGR) took over control of the station and designated the line which served it as the Chikuhi Line. With the privatization of Japanese National Railways (JNR), the successor of JGR, on 1 April 1987, control of the station passed to JR Kyushu.

Passenger statistics
In fiscal 2016, the station was used by an average of 4,944 passengers daily (boarding passengers only), and it ranked 40th among the busiest stations of JR Kyushu.

Environs
National Route 202
Marukumayama old burial mound
Marutai Head Office
Kyushu University Ito Campus
Chikuzen High School

See also
 List of railway stations in Japan

References

External links
Susenji Station (JR Kyushu)

Railway stations in Japan opened in 1925
Chikuhi Line
Railway stations in Fukuoka Prefecture
Stations of Kyushu Railway Company